Michael Gettel (born Oct. 18, 1958) is a recording artist, composer, and pianist, who has been creating, teaching, and performing music for decades. Widely known for his piano and composition work, the native of Evergreen, Colorado, has released 13 albums in the New Age genre.

The first was “San Juan Suite” in 1986.

His latest album, “The View from Here,” was released Feb. 11, 2022 on First Snow Music. A single, “The Parting Glass,” was released Dec. 10, 2021, and a followup, “Aerial,” came out Jan. 14, 2022.

Gettel and his wife, Elizabeth Naccarato Gettel, also a recording artist, composer and pianist, live in San Luis, Colorado. They released a 14-track collaborative work, “One Piano,” in 2001.

Gettel also has contributed to many musical collections, most notably on the Narada label.

Michael Gettel and Elizabeth Naccarato Gettel are the founders of San Luis Music, an emerging non-profit organization dedicated to developing young musical talent, and coaching aspiring songwriters, singers, and musicians.

Michael's website went online June 16, 2002, at https://www.michaelgettel.com/

Michael Gettel's new release: Feb. 11, 2022 
His much-anticipated piano music, titled "The View From Here," now is available. Details can be found in the description below.

 By the end of May, 2022, Gettel's new release had reached No. 1 on the New Age Music Chart (NAMC).
 By June, 2022, Gettel's new release reached No. 1 on the One World Radio Music Charts.

Early life 
The son of Raymond and Patricia Gettel, Michael is the youngest of two: His sister, Sharon, is 3½ years older. The family of four relocated in the early 1960s from the East Coast to Evergreen, Colorado, while Michael still was quite young. His father was a civil engineer who worked for the Bureau of Reclamation at the Denver Federal Center.

Gettel's musical aptitude revealed itself at an early age, and by age 7, he was surprised by the gift of an upright piano and a trumpet. This set off Gettel into a world of musical creativity that carried him through adolescence and became the primary focus of his life. His parents were committed completely to offering every musical opportunity to him, while at the same time, his sister Sharon excelled in classical ballet. On any given week throughout the sibling's young lives, several days a week would be set aside for Patricia to drive to Denver to pass Michael off to his father for trumpet and piano lessons, orchestra and jazz band rehearsals. Their mother also took Sharon to classes at the Colorado Ballet where she later became a principal dancer. This dedication to their children had a lasting effect.

As Michael matured in his piano and trumpet ability, more opportunities opened. He became one of the youngest members of the Golden Youth Symphony and toured Europe during the summer when he was 13. This experience evoked Gettel's love for travel, and throughout his years as a music educator, he led international trips to England, Scotland and France for students from the Bush School in Seattle.

Gettel first started composing while he attended middle school, creating songs with lyrics and arranging them for other instruments. He was very drawn to the outdoors, and enjoyed backpacking nearly every summer with his father in the Gore Range, close to Vail. The experience of being secluded  in the wilderness – as well as visits to one of his most sublime inspiration sites, Mesa Verde – gave Gettel the incentive to capture the landscapes in his music. That later emerged in his recording, “Skywatching,” among others. Piano coach Phyllis Pieffer became an influential presence, and she encouraged Gettel to jump into serious composition on the piano. His “Sonata for Two Pianos” was premiered at the Colorado State Piano Competition. It was awarded an honorary prize, the only original work to be so distinguished.

Gettel graduated from Evergreen High School in 1977. He had the incredible fortune of being tutored by music educators who pushed his boundaries. Having fulfilled all of his academic credits early, Gettel's senior year found him taking only music classes that prepared him for the serious competition of music on the university level.

Recording career

Independent Recording Years (1985-1989) 
Gettel graduated from the University Of Northern Colorado in 1980 with a double degree in Music Theory and Composition, and was offered a position to teach music at the prestigious Kent Denver School. In 1984, he was accepted to the Klingenstein Institute at Columbia University, New York, for young independent school teachers. He also traveled to Washington State’s Puget Sound region in the summers to boat in the San Juan Islands with friend and-soon-to-be label partner Mathew Dimarco. It was at this time Gettel began composing piano pieces for his seminal recording, “San Juan Suite.”

After connecting with numerous gift shops and art galleries in the San Juan Islands, the decision was made to record a cassette of nine original songs on his new Indie label, Sounding Records, managed by Dimarco. The songs were interspersed uniquely with natural ambient sounds indigenous to the region. The immediate reception was overwhelmingly positive, and created a unique niche for the young pianist composer. Concerts and appearances throughout the region were numerous, and as the word grew through tourists and boaters, more small businesses sought out the recording, creating a supply-and-demand crisis. It was decided to re-record the album for CD at Kaye Smith Studios in Seattle. The release was welcomed by a few large independent distributors, and  subsequently sold several hundreds of thousands of albums with no major label involvement.

Gettel was intent on broadening his musical palette with his second release, “Intricate Balance,” which featured his first forays into arranging for other acoustic instruments (specifically oboe), and new experiments with electronic keyboards and percussion. The album was released by Sounding Records in 1987 and obtained by Seattle-based Miramar Productions in 1992.

The final release for Sounding Records came in 1989 with “Return,” a much more carefully arranged collection of pieces with a large cast of instrumentalists. Recorded again at Kaye Smith Studios (which soon became Heart's Bad Animals) and mixed in Denver, “Return” showcased Gettel not only as a maturing composer, arranger and producer, but as a new formidable figure in the New Age movement. The album enjoyed great success independently, and caught the attention of more than a few major players in the New Age market. Ultimately, the decision was made to dissolve Sounding Records in favor of taking the risk with a larger label that had more presence in the market and more ability to promote internationally. Gettel signed with the prominent label Narada, while also agreeing to license his first two recordings with Miramar Productions. Narada was given the rights to release “Return” on its Sona Gaia label in 1990, and a new opportunity opened to Gettel's creative output.

The Narada Years (1990-2000s) 
Gettel solidified his contract with Narada while on a backpacking trip to the American Southwest with students from Seattle's Bush School, at which he had accepted a teaching position in 1988. The contract was faxed to him at Zion National Park. It is no surprise one of the most memorable songs on his first Narada release was, “Angel’s Landing.” In the summer of 1991 after signing, Narada called in its first record option, but there was a catch. It was to be produced by, Billy Oskay of the group Nightnoise on Windham Hill. This created consternation with Gettel, since he had assumed he would be producing his work. Throughout the summer, Gettel travelled from Seattle to Portland to consult with Oskay, and began recording in August at Desitrek Studios. The sessions were difficult and often unproductive, but it was through these sessions that Gettel met two of the most important musicians that would help shape the next 10 years of his work on Narada: bassist Sandin Wilson and double-reed specialist Nancy Rumbel. While work on the release continued through October, the rough mixes submitted to the label were not accepted and the album was shelved until the spring. The mixes were completed with the additional assistance of David Arkenstone and fellow Narada artist Kostia. Although a rough initiation to the major label world, “Places In Time” was released on Narada's Equinox label to successful reviews and charted quickly on Billboard's New Age charts.
“Skywatching” quickly followed Gettel's inaugural release, and found him with more control as the full producer and arranger of the album. With Sandin Wilson and Nancy Rumbel returning as significant contributors to the album's full palette, they were joined by guitarist Paul Speer on several tracks and a spontaneous visit by David Lanz, which turned into the compelling improvised duet of “First Snow.”  An additional new expert arrived in engineer Frank Bry, who would work with Gettel on all his major Narada releases throughout the '90s. Another important development was the change of location to Robert Lang Studios in Richmond Beach, North Seattle. The studio was a well-known location among Seattle musicians, and was moving forward to develop into a much larger campus that later would serve local and world acts such as Nirvana, Dave Matthews, Foo Fighters, among many other A-list artists. Narada found an intriguing marketing strategy for “Skywatching” in association with the travel magazine Arizona Highways, and the release helped cement Gettel as a mainstay in the Narada lineup.

“The Key” followed in 1994 and took on a completely different inspirational concept: an archetypal journey of the heart. The arranging and instrumentation stretched Gettel's musical boundaries and the studio's capabilities at the time, with a few tracks overreaching the limits of the mixing board. Initially, Narada had a hands-off approach to the concept, but Gettel was undeterred, and flew to the label offices in Milwaukee, Wis., to consult with CEO Wesley Van-Linda. Gettel said he would not alter the conceptual direction of the release. The final result yielded several radio-friendly singles, including “Breaking The Silence,” “Turning of a Key,” and “Through The Doorway.” The release was considered by many critics as one of the best produced new age albums of its time.

“The Art of Nature: Reflections on the Grand Design” started as a collaboration between Gettel's new compositions and photographer Bruce Heinemann's nature landscapes. The album was recorded at Robert Lang's where studio construction was ongoing. Familiar specialists Sandin Wilson, Nancy Rumbel and engineer/mixer Frank Bry contributed. In addition to the release, a DVD was planned as an accompaniment, with Oscar-winning actor Tom Skerritt narrating. The album and DVD were well received, with the DVD winning the gold prize in 1998 for long-form music video at the Houston International Film Festival. The complexities of the orchestration and arranging again pushed the envelope for the composer and the engineer, yielding phenomenal results.

In 1996, Gettel took a break from his Narada contract and was allowed to release an independent album where he chose to revisit his first inspiration of Washington's San Juan Islands. “San Juan Suite II – A Day in the Islands” was the only album released on the newly established Gray Day Productions with partner Randy Sherwood. The album brought Sandin Wilson and Gettel back together at Robert Lang Studios to create one of the only piano/fretless bass albums in existence. Along with Gettel's signature natural ambient sounds (now, a mainstay in his musical palette with cameos on most of his releases), and incidental vocals from Sherwood, the album was a perfect companion to the original first release. It later was released that year on Narada (Enso), and finally as a double package on Narada Classic in 2006.

The year 1997 found Gettel once again on the Narada roster with the release “Winter,” a compilation of some of his previous seasonal singles along with several new solo piano compositions. Some of his most beloved songs can be found here including, “Prelude: First Snow,” “Lantern In The Dark,” “Aspens In January,” and “Final Snowfall,” the last three of which were published in sheet music form from Hal Leonard Music.

“Change My Heart, Oh God, Piano" was released through the Vineyard Music Group in 1998. The label approached Gettel to interpret their most beloved worship songs as he did to much critical acclaim.

Gettel saw a final release on the Narada label in 1999.“The Journey North” was another epic archetypal journey through the heart of England and Scotland, and his instrumentation did not disappoint. From all of the international travels Gettel took with Bush School students through England and Scotland in the '90s, many of the inspirational moments that found fertile ground in this release. Among the list of musician guests were, of course, Sandin Wilson on fretless bass, Jerry O’Sullivan on Uilleann pipes and Irish whistles, Brian Thiessan on guitar, Davin McLaird on drums, and Frank Bry again at the mixing helm. The album closes with the surprise tune, "She Moved Through the Fair," a traditional Celtic folk song featuring Rita Springer on vocal. The live band created an incredible sense of spontaneity, and many critics considered this release the finest of Gettel's Narada recordings. Later in 1997, Gettel and Springer collaborated on the title song for the motion picture, “Still Breathing,” starring Brendan Fraser and Joanna Going.

At the close of the decade, upon reaching out to the label to complete his final contract option, Gettel summarily was dismissed from the label in a 30-second phone call. With the collapse of the current recording industry, Narada eventually was liquidized, and the artist roster was sold to other entities.

The late 1990s through early 2000s saw a lot of emotional upheaval in Gettel's personal life. His 18-year marriage ended abruptly and surprisingly. Michael reached out to friends for support, and among them was Elizabeth Naccarato, a recording artist with whom he had produced years earlier. A romance ensued and they were married in 2000. The artists collaborated to create in 2001 a “he said-she said” release cleverly titled “One Piano” on Suzanne Ciani's Seventh Wave Records. Given the state of the independent industry at the time, the release largely was overlooked and did not connect with listeners as expected. 

With this result, Gettel went silent.

The Quiet Years (2007-2020) 
With the exception of a few Narada compilation releases, and the significant release of the new double album set “San Juan Suite I/II” in 2006, no new material was recorded during the next 15 years. Gettel focused on his three children and new marriage, as well as his teaching at the Bush School in Seattle. That afforded him numerous opportunities to coach music students, and to travel with them to the southwest, England, Scotland and France. In 2014, the leadership at the school changed, and abruptly altered Gettel's connection with music students. This change was unacceptable to Gettel, he resigned his position in 2015 and relocated along with his wife Elizabeth to his home state of Colorado. The move seemed preordained, and the couple arrived in very rural southwestern San Luis, the oldest registered town in Colorado. The location, landscape and community was perfect for the reinvention of his creativity, and after a 20-year hiatus from composing, the next musical concept hit unexpectedly.

The View From Here (2021/2022) 
In early January, 2021, Gettel felt a strong pull to once again jump into composing with the intention of releasing the new material to the public. He reached out to his longtime constant companion in the studio, engineer/mixer Frank Bry, as well as studio owner Robert Lang, and both welcomed the opportunity to be reunited in Seattle after a 20-year hiatus. Plans were made to record in October.

Gettel spent April at his piano, writing out 12 new pieces by hand, and spent the subsequent months rehearsing the new material. The sessions at Bobby Lang's occurred the week of Oct. 10–15, and were nostalgic and fruitful. They also included the appearance of young pianist Kelsey Lee Cate, who was invited to duet on the song, “Rise.” The first single, “The Parting Glass,” was released Dec. 10 on First Snow Music; the second single, "Aerial," was released Jan. 14, 2022.

The full album was released Feb. 11, 2022.

“The View From Here” is a return to Gettel's solo piano days, and in some ways reminiscent of his debut album, “San Juan Suite.” His love of merging natural ambient sounds with his compositions reappears here to great effect. 

The album has been honored with two silver medals from The 2022 Global Music Awards for the New Age and Composition categories, as well as a nomination from the 2022 Hollywood Music In Media Awards, for the single, "Van Gogh Sky," in the Neoclassical category.

The View From Here: Reviews 
 BT Fasmer, New Age Music Guide, May 13, 2022.
 Steve Sheppard for One World Music Radio, April 26, 2022.
 R J Lannan, Artisan Music Reviews, April 6, 2022.
 Review by Michael Debbage, MainlyPiano.com, Feb. 27, 2022.
 5 Finger Review by Bea Willis, Feb. 17, 2022.
 The JW Vibe: Music That Sticks to My Soul, by Jonathan Widran, Feb. 9, 2022.
 Review by Kathy Parsons, MainlyPiano.com, Jan. 25, 2022.

Discography

Album Releases 
1986 – “San Juan Suite,” Sounding Records; in 1988, Miramar Recordings; and 1998, Narada. 

1987 – “Intricate Balance,” Sounding Records; and 1992, Miramar Recordings.

1989 – “Return” Sounding Records; 1990, Sona Gaia Productions.

1992 – “Places In Time,” Narada Equinox.

1993 – “Skywatching,” Narada Equinox.

1994 – “The Key,” Narada Equinox.

1995 – “The Art Of Nature: Reflections On The Grand Design,” Narada Equinox.

1996 – “San Juan Suite II – A Day in the Islands,” Gray Day Productions; and 1997, Enso Records.

1997 – “Winter,” Narada Equinox.

1998 – “Change My Heart Oh God, Piano,” Vineyard Music.

1999 – “The Journey North,” Narada.

2001 – “One Piano,” by Michael Gettel and Elizabeth Naccarato; Red Chair Music, Seventh Wave.

2006 – “Narada Classic: San Juan Suite I/San Juan Suite II,” Narada.

2022 – “The View From Here,” First Snow Music.

Singles 
2021 – “The Parting Glass” from “The View From Here,” First Snow Music.

2022 – “Aerial” from “The View From Here,” First Snow Music.

DVDs 
1994 – “Timeless,” Image Entertainment.

1997 – “The Art of Nature,” Michael Gettel, composer, and Tom Skerritt, narrator; Image Entertainment.

Compilations

Michael Gettel's songs in these releases 

 From the album "Respiro" – the track “Windows and Walls,” 1993, New Sounds Multimedia.
 From "Fantasy" – “Surrender,” 1994, New Sounds Multimedia.
 From "Song of the Dolphin" – “Every Shade of Green,” 1997, Hallmark Records.
 From "Narada Collection 4” – “Memory In the Snow,” 1993, Narada.
 From "Forever Wild" – “Shelter,” “Windows and Walls,” “The Storyteller Sleeps,” 1996, Narada.
 From "Earth Songs" – “Earth Cry Mercy,” 1993, Narada.
 From "Miramar Collection One" – “Intricate Balance,” “Sucia,” Miramar, 1994.
 From "Wind and Reed" – “Surrender,” Narada Lotus, 1993.
 From "Romance  Music for Piano” – “A State of Grace,” Narada, 1994.
 From "Narada Christmas Collection, The Best of Narada Christmas” – “Il Est Né (He Is Born),” 1992.
 From "Red Rose" – “Breaking The Silence,” 1994, New Sounds Multimedia.
 From "Rebirth” – “Flight,"1997, New Sounds Multimedia.
 From "Piano Solos" – “Gentle Earth and Sky,” 1992, Narada. 
 From "Magica" – “Whalesong,” 1992, New Sounds Multimedia.
 From "Narada Collection 5" – “Light on the Land,” 1995, Narada. 
 From "Narada Showcase Collection" – “Whalesong,” 1997, Narada,Virgin Music.
 From "Narada Smooth Jazz" – “Zuni Rain,” 1997, Narada.
 From "Hallmark Music Collection" – “Through The Heartland,” Hallmark Music, 1998.
 From "Monografie" – “Skywatching,” 1993, New Sounds Multimedia.
 From "Discover Narada 2" –“Skywatching,” 1993, Narada. 
 From "Pathos" – “Memory In The Snow,” 1992, New Sounds Multimedia.
 From “The World of Narada” – “Cumbrian Autumn,” 1999, Narada.
 From "Narada Decade: The Anniversary Collection” – “Memory In the Snow,” 1993, Narada.
 From "Colors" – “Gentle Earth and Sky,” 1992, New Sounds Multimedia.
 From "20 Years of Narada Piano" – “Aspens in January,” “Watercolors,” “Orcas,” 2001, Narada.
 From "The Best of Narada Christmas" – “Il Est Né (He Is Born),” 1998, Narada.
 From "Close To The Heart" – “Through Bucky"s Eyes,” “The Old House Is Silent,” 1995, Narada.
 From "The Best New Age" – “Intricate Balance,” 1995, Priority Records.
 From "Piano Forte" – “River Run,” 1996, New Sounds Multimedia.
 From “Sweet Burning Light” – “The Turning of a Key,” 1999, Sparrow Records.
 From "Chillout Moods" – “Cumbrian Autumn,” “When All Is Quiet (She Dreams Of Horses),”  2001, Disky.
 From "True Colors" – “Loch Ness: The Kelpie,” 1999, New Sounds Multimedia.
 From "Narada Collection 4" – “Zuni Rain,” 1994, Narada.
 From "Best of Narada New Age" – “Prelude: First Snow,” 2002, Narada.
 From "Narada Decade Two Evolution" – “Skywatching,” 2001, Narada.
 From "KINK Lights Out IV" – “Prelude: Stillness,” 1991, KINK-FM 102.
 From "Rhythms of the Road" – “The Straits,” 1993, Creative Media Development.
 From "Sona Gaia Collection One"-- “The Holy Lands,” 1990, Sona Gaia.
 From "Stories: A Narada Artist Collection" – “The Story Behind Your Eyes,” 1998, Narada Equinox.
 From "Summer Fields: A Collection of Piano and Nature" – “The Calling,” “Wind and Water,” “Surrender,” “Every Shade of Green,” “Moonrise Over Orcas,” 2005, Borders.
 From "Nick, The Nightfly 3: Music For The Night" – “Ceud Mile Failte (A Hundred Thousand Welcomes),” 1999, BMG.
 From "Natural Wonders" – “Wellspring,” 2005, Borders.
 From "The Nature of Narada" – “Anasazi Roads,” 2002, Virgin.

Interviews with Michael Gettel 

 Perspectives with the Oracle with Todd Johnston of Oracle Guitars and Donna Jo Thornton on The Morning Breeze, May 22, 2022.
 Perspectives with the Oracle with Todd Johnston of Oracle Guitars and Donna Jo Thornton on The Morning Breeze, Feb. 20, 2022.
 Interview by Kathy Parsons with Michael Gettel, a preview of his upcoming release "The View From Here," MainlyPiano.com, Jan. 24, 2022.
 Joe Miller, Titans of Transition, a YouTube presentation, Oct. 26, 2021.
 Joe Miller, Titans of Transition, a YouTube presentation, April 8, 2021.

Living people
American new-age musicians
Year of birth missing (living people)